Simon Mugava (born 29 November 1990) is a Zimbabwean first-class cricketer who plays for Mid West Rhinos. He was part of Zimbabwe's squad for the 2010 Under-19 Cricket World Cup.

He made his first-class debut for Mid West Rhinos against Mountaineers at Mutare Sports Club on 23 March 2010 in the 2009–10 Logan Cup. He made his List A debut on 7 April 2010 against Mashonaland Eagles in the 2009–10 Faithwear Metbank One-Day Competition. He made his Twenty20 debut on 29 November 2011 against Matabeleland Tuskers in the 2011–12 Stanbic Bank 20 Series.

References

External links

1990 births
Living people
Zimbabwean cricketers
Mid West Rhinos cricketers
Sportspeople from Harare